Cribbage, sometimes called cribbage pool, fifteen points and pair pool, is a two-player pool game that, like its namesake card game, has a scoring system which awards points for pairing groups of balls (rather than playing cards) that total 15. Played on a standard pool table, participants who  a ball of a particular number are required to immediately pocket the companion ball that tallies to 15 when added to the prior ball's number. Each pair so pocketed counts as a cribbage; there are seven such pairs, and the 15 ball counts as an eighth by itself after all of the others have been pocketed. The first player to score five cribbages wins the game.

Gameplay

Setup

All other balls are placed randomly except that no two of the three corner balls may total to fifteen. Such an open-ended racking rule is unusual in that most pool games require particular balls to be placed at the corners of the rack and sometimes in fixed positions inside the rack as well. The arrangement thus results in 134,120,448,000 possible racking patterns (14 × 12 × 10 × 2 × 11!).

An  is required in cribbage, meaning that on the  either a ball must be pocketed or at least four balls must be driven to rails (as opposed to a ). The object of the game is to score 5 cribbages out of a possible 8 in a full rack of 15 balls.

Cribbages
A cribbage is a pair of numbered balls which, when added together, total 15. A cribbage only lies where the two partner balls forming the cribbage are each legally , i.e., where no  is committed on the same strokes that pocket the balls, or the shot is otherwise deemed illegal.

Rules of play
A cribbage only counts when the paired balls are pocketed in succession in the same . When a player first pockets a ball, it is described as on a cribbage.

In older rules a foul was a loss of one point. Three successive fouls in cribbage is a loss of game. Pocketing the 15-ball when it is not the last ball on the table is not a foul. Instead it is immediately spotted and play continues without penalty.

If incidental balls are pocketed on the same stroke that a cribbage is completed, they add to the succession of cribbages the player is "on". When a player fouls by failing to pocket an unpaired cribbage while on a succession of unpaired balls, only unpaired balls are spotted; the prior successful cribbages count toward the score.

Normal ball and rail foul rules apply in cribbage. If in this situation two or more object balls are equidistantly closest to the head string, the player may designate which ball is to be relocated.

References

Pool (cue sports)